Eilika Weber-Ban (born 15 November 1968 in Karlsruhe) is a German biochemist. Her research considers protein degradation pathways. She was elected to the European Molecular Biology Organization in 2021.

Early life and education 
Weber-Ban studied biochemistry at the University of Tübingen. She then received a Fulbright Program scholarship and went to the University of California at Riverside. Here she studied the tryptophan sunthase bienzyme complex under the supervision of Michael Dunn. She completed her graduate studies in 1996, and was awarded a Jane Coffin Childs Memorial Fund for Medical Research fellowship to join Arthur Horwich at Yale University.

Research and career 
In 2001 she moved to the Institute for Molecular Biology and Biophysics at ETH Zurich. She was promoted to Professor in 2010. Her research considers the function and substrate recruitment mechanisms of bacterial degradation complexes, with a particular focus on Mycobacterium tuberculosis. Such bacteria rely on degradation pathways to survive the conditions inside the infected hosts.

Weber-Ban was elected to the European Molecular Biology Organization in 2021.

Select publications

Personal life 
Weber-Ban is married to Nenad Ban, a professor at ETH Zurich.

References 

1968 births
German women biochemists
German biochemists
Living people
Scientists from Karlsruhe
University of California, Riverside alumni
University of Tübingen alumni